Common ownership refers to holding the assets of an organization, enterprise or community indivisibly rather than in the names of the individual members or groups of members as common property.

Forms of common ownership exist in every economic system. Common ownership of the means of production is a central goal of communist political movements as it is seen as a necessary democratic mechanism for the creation and continued function of a communist society. Advocates make a distinction between collective ownership and common property as the former refers to property owned jointly by agreement of a set of colleagues, such as producer cooperatives, whereas the latter refers to assets that are completely open for access, such as a public park freely available to everyone.

Christian societies 
The first church in Jerusalem shared all their money and possessions (Acts of the Apostles 2 and 4). Inspired by the Early Christians, many Christians have since tried to follow their example of community of goods and common ownership. Common ownership is practiced by some Christian groups such as the Hutterites (for about 500 years), the Bruderhof (for some 100 years) and others. In those cases, property is generally owned by a charity set up for the purpose of maintaining the members of the religious groups.

In capitalist economies 
Common ownership is practiced by large numbers of voluntary associations and non-profit organizations as well as implicitly by all public bodies. Most co-operatives have some element of common ownership, but some part of their capital may be individually owned.

Marxist theory 
Many socialist movements advocate the common ownership of the means of production by all of society as an eventual goal to be achieved through the development of the productive forces, although many socialists classify socialism as public ownership of the means of production, reserving common ownership for what Karl Marx termed "upper-stage communism". From a Marxist analysis, a society based on a superabundance of goods and common ownership of the means of production would be devoid of classes based on ownership of productive property.

Common ownership in a hypothetical communist society is distinguished from primitive forms of common property that have existed throughout history, such as communalism and primitive communism, in that communist common ownership is the outcome of social and technological developments leading to the elimination of material scarcity in society.

From 1918 until 1995, the common ownership of the means of production, distribution and exchange was cited in Clause IV of its constitution as a goal of the British Labour Party and was quoted on the back of its membership cards. The clause read:
To secure for the workers by hand or by brain the full fruits of their industry and the most equitable distribution thereof that may be possible upon the basis of the common ownership of the means of production, distribution and exchange, and the best obtainable system of popular administration and control of each industry or service.

Antitrust economics 
In antitrust economics, common ownership describes a situation in which large investors own shares in several firms that compete within the same industry. As a result of this overlapping ownership, these firms may have reduced incentives to compete against each other because they internalize the profit-reducing effect that their competitive actions have on each other.

The theory was first developed by Julio Rotemberg in 1984. Several empirical contributions document the growing importance of common ownership and provide evidence to support the theory. Because of concern about these anticompetitive effects, common ownership has "stimulated a major rethinking of antitrust enforcement". The United States Department of Justice, the Federal Trade Commission, the European Commission, and the OECD have all acknowledged concerns about the effects of common ownership on lessening product market competition.

Contract theory 
Neoclassical economic theory analyzes common ownership using contract theory. According to the incomplete contracting approach pioneered by Oliver Hart and his co-authors, ownership matters because the owner of an asset has residual control rights. This means that the owner can decide what to do with the asset in every contingency not covered by a contract. In particular, an owner has stronger incentives to make relationship-specific investments than a non-owner, so ownership can ameliorate the so-called hold-up problem. As a result, ownership is a scarce resource that should not be wasted. In particular, a central result of the property rights approach says that joint ownership is suboptimal. If we start in a situation with joint ownership (where each party has veto power over the use of the asset) and move to a situation in which there is a single owner, the investment incentives of the new owner are improved while the investment incentives of the other parties remain the same. However, in the basic incomplete contracting framework the suboptimally of joint ownership holds only if the investments are in human capital while joint ownership can be optimal if the investments are in physical capital. Recently, several authors have shown that joint ownership can actually be optimal even if investments are in human capital. In particular, joint ownership can be optimal if the parties are asymmetrically informed, if there is a long-term relationship between the parties, or if the parties have know-how that they may disclose.

See also

References

External links 
 The Co-operative Advantage - Creating a successful family of Co-operative businesses. The Report of the Co-operative Commission January 2001. The Co-operative Commission was established by British prime minister Tony Blair in 2000 and recommended that A modernizing bill should be put before Parliament to recognize in law the Co-operative form of common ownership. (recommendation 51).
 Frank H. Stephen (1984) The Economic Analysis of Producers' Cooperatives London:Macmillan, p. 145

Economic systems
Anarchist theory
Socialism
Property